Leonard Daniel Pigg (September 18, 1919 – August 22, 1993), nicknamed "Fatty", was an American Negro league catcher in the 1940s and 1950s.

A native of Grant, Oklahoma, Pigg served in the US Army during World War II. He made his Negro leagues debut with the Indianapolis Clowns in 1947, and played for the team for several seasons. Pigg also played for the Carman Cardinals and Brandon Greys of the Mandak League. He died in Seattle, Washington in 1993 at age 73.

References

External links
 and Seamheads

1919 births
1993 deaths
Indianapolis Clowns players
20th-century African-American sportspeople
Baseball catchers
United States Army personnel of World War II